Mauritania competed at the 1988 Summer Olympics in Seoul, South Korea.

Competitors
The following is the list of number of competitors in the Games.

Athletics 

Men

Wrestling 

Men's freestyle

Men's Greco-Roman

References

Official Olympic Reports

Nations at the 1988 Summer Olympics
1988
Oly